Steven Harris Ramdev (born 9 August 2001) is an Indian artist and graphic designer from Bangalore. He represented India at the WorldSkills Special Edition 2022 in Graphic Design Technology and won the Medallion for Excellence, earning the title of WorldSkills Champion. The competition was held at Aarau, Switzerland. He also won the silver medal in Eurasia Skills 2022 competition and the medallion for excellence in Global Skills Challenge 2022. He is the recipient of more than 150 awards and honours, including the letter of appreciation by the Prime Minister of India in 2021. The Prime Minister expressed hope that Steven's efforts to spread positivity in the society will inspire everyone.

Education 
Steven attended BNM Public School in Bangalore, and pursued his undergraduate studies from National Institute of Fashion Technology (NIFT) Chennai and Bengaluru.

Awards and Recognitions 
In 2021, Steven won a video message from Hrithik Roshan. Hrithik appreciated his paintings and lauded his achievements. The Prime Minister of India Narendra Modi praised Steven after he sent him two beautiful paintings of his and a letter as well. Prime Minister Narendra Modi had written to Steven praising him for his paintings. He had sent two paintings of the Prime Minister along with a letter. The Prime Minister replied with encouragement and praise for Steven. The Prime Minister wrote that it was a pleasure to see the interest and devotion of the young people in the creative fields. The Prime Minister also lauded Steven for his views about public health and welfare during the pandemic period and expressed the hope that people will be inspired by Steven’s effort to spread positivity. Steven who became popular for his paintings, shared his experience with the Press after being appreciated by the Prime Minister. He said that the Prime Minister is an inspiration for the youth of the country and praised India's vaccination program in the fight against Coronavirus.

In 2022, he was selected by the Government of India to represent the country at the WorldSkills Special Edition 2022 for Graphic Design Technology skill.  He won the silver medal in both the South Regional and National competitions of India Skills 2021. Steven also earned the Medallion for Excellence in the Global Skills Competition 2022 conducted by WorldSkills Australia. He also represented the country in Eurasia Skills 2022 and bagged the Silver medal along with three other winners. In the month of October 2022, he competed with 22 countries at the WorldSkills Special Edition 2022 in Graphic Design Technology and earned the Medallion for Excellence, settling on the 4th position. In total, India bagged 2 Silver, 3 Bronze and 13 Medallion for Excellence Medals.

References 

2001 births
Living people